David Davies (1817–1855) was a Welsh harpist. 
His father was David Davies of Gelligaer, Glamorganshire. He learnt the harp from a young age, and to complete his education studied in France for three years, becoming a skilled performer on the triple harp . He competed at Eisteddfod, and won a number of prizes.

He died in 1855 and is buried in Gelligaer churchyard.

References 

1817 births
1855 deaths
People from Gelligaer
Welsh harpists
19th-century Welsh musicians